Miri Yampolsky is a Russian pianist and a naturalised Israeli citizen.

In 1994, Yampolsky won the IX José Iturbi Competition. A lecturer at the Cornell University's Department of Music, she has organised a Shostakovich Festival at Ithaca.

Her relatives include pianists Vladimir Yampolsky and Tatiana Yampolsky, and conductor Victor Yampolsky. She is married to Xak Bjerken, and has three children, Misha, Anna, and Maya.

References

Russian classical pianists
Russian women pianists
Musicians from Moscow
Israeli classical pianists
Israeli women pianists
José Iturbi International Piano Competition prize-winners
Living people
1971 births
Jewish classical pianists
21st-century classical pianists
Women classical pianists
21st-century women pianists